Karen Ritscher is an American violist and academic.

She is on the faculties of the Manhattan School of Music, New York University and Boston University. She has performed and taught in the United States, Asia and Europe. She is a certified 5Rhythms® Movement teacher, she has led workshops and clinics, often combining the exploration of movement with the art of self-expression as a musician.

Ritscher served as the Principal Violist for both the Dallas Opera and the Houston Grand Opera and the Assistant Principal for the American Composers Orchestra. She has performed with the Orpheus Chamber Orchestra, the Houston Symphony, New York City Ballet Orchestra and the New York City Opera Orchestra. She has been a member of the Aureus Piano Quartet the Azure Ensemble as well as playing in many other chamber music ensembles and festivals. She has commissioned and performed  new works by composers such as by Chen Yi, Bruce Adolphe and Gabriela Lena Frank.

Ritscher has served on the faculties of Rice University, the Mannes College of Music, Oberlin Conservatory and the Eastman School of Music. She has served on the faculty of the Karen Tuttle Coordination Workshop since its inception. She was the string consultant for Madeline Bruser's book, "The Art of Practicing; A Guide to Making Music from the Heart."

References 

American classical violists
Women violists
Living people
Year of birth missing (living people)
Manhattan School of Music faculty
Place of birth missing (living people)